Zavodice is a small settlement in the hills southeast of Nazarje in Slovenia. The area belongs to the traditional region of Styria and is now included in the Savinja Statistical Region.

References

External links
Zavodice on Geopedia

Populated places in the Municipality of Nazarje